Rene Ashwin Ong is an American astrophysicist known for his work in experimental high-energy astrophysics, astroparticle physics, and particle physics. He is a professor at the University of California, Los Angeles.

Education
Ong graduated from the University of Michigan in 1981 and obtained his Ph.D. from Stanford University in 1987.  He was a Robert R. McCormick Fellow at the Enrico Fermi Institute from 1988 to 1991, before becoming an assistant professor at the University of Chicago.

Career

Ong's early research focused on electron–positron annihilation at SLAC PEP, including development of the first vertex drift chamber for a collider experiment with Martin Perl, followed by his doctoral work on the B hadron lifetime.

His research interests shifted to gamma-ray astronomy in 1990 after joining the Chicago Air Shower Array experiment, with the encouragement of James Cronin.
He has since continued research in astrophysics with involvement in STACEE, the Fermi Gamma-ray Space Telescope, VERITAS, GAPS, and the  Cherenkov Telescope Array (CTA). His roles in these experiments have included principal investigator of STACEE, co-spokesperson of the CTA Consortium, and co-principal investigator of GAPS.

Awards and recognitions
In 2013, he was elected a Fellow of the American Physical Society "for his contribution to high energy particle astrophysics, in particular his contribution to very high energy gamma ray astronomy, where his research has spanned four decades of the electromagnetic spectrum."

References

External links
Personal home page

Year of birth missing (living people)
Living people
21st-century American physicists
University of Michigan alumni
Stanford University alumni
Fellows of the American Physical Society
University of California, Los Angeles faculty